Turn A Gundam is a 1999 Japanese mecha drama anime series and the eighth incarnation to Sunrise's long-running Gundam franchise. It was created for the Gundam Big Bang 20th Anniversary celebration and is directed by Yoshiyuki Tomino. It aired on Fuji TV from April 9, 1999 to April 14, 2000.

Episode list

References

External links
 List of Episodes in the Official Website (Japanese)
 Turn A Gundam Official Website (Japanese)

Turn A Gundam
Turn A Gundam
Turn A Gundam